Mihkel Aksalu (born 7 November 1984) is an Estonian professional footballer who plays as a goalkeeper for Meistriliiga club Paide Linnameeskond.

Club career

Kuressaare
Aksalu joined the youth system of his hometown club Kuressaare and played for their reserve team Muhumaa (renamed Sörve in 2002). He made his debut in the Meistriliiga in his single appearance for Kuressaare on 23 September 2000, in a 4–1 away win over Valga.

Flora
In December 2002, Aksalu was included in Flora's first team squad for pre-season training. During his first seasons with the club, he mostly played for the club's reserve side Tervis Pärnu. Aksalu became a regular starter for Flora in the 2006 season. His first trophy with Flora came in the 2007–08 Estonian Cup.

Sheffield United
On 29 January 2010, following a successful trial, Aksalu signed a two-and-a-half-year contract with Championship club Sheffield United for a transfer fee of £180,000. Kevin Blackwell, Sheffield United's manager at the time, claimed Aksalu was the best goalkeeping triallist he had seen in a long time and had the potential to become Estonia's number one. However, Aksalu failed to impress new manager Gary Speed and was unable to break into the first team.

On 6 October 2010, Aksalu joined Conference National club Mansfield Town on a two-month loan. He remained sidelined through most of his spell due to an abdominal muscle problem, making only three appearances before returning to Bramall Lane in December. After a lengthy spell on the sidelines following back surgery, Aksalu was released by the club on 19 January 2012.

Return to Flora
Following his release, Aksalu returned to Estonia and began training with his former club Flora to regain his fitness. He rejoined the team on 9 April 2012.

SJK

On 4 April 2013, Aksalu signed a one-year contract with Ykkönen club SJK. He made his debut for the team on 4 May 2013, in a 2–1 home win over PK-35 Vantaa. SJK won the 2013 Ykkönen and were promoted to the Veikkausliiga. In October 2013, Aksalu signed a new two-year contract with the club. On 24 August 2015, his contract was extended to 2017. Aksalu won the Veikkausliiga title in the 2015 season. He was named league's Best Goalkeeper and SJK's Player of the Year. Aksalu was named club captain ahead of the 2016 season. On 24 September 2016, Aksalu helped his team win the 2016 Finnish Cup by saving two penalties in a shootout against HJK in the final.

International career
Aksalu has represented Estonia at under-16, under-17, under-20 and under-21 levels, amassing 20 youth appearances overall.

He made his senior international debut for Estonia on 17 October 2007, playing the first half of a friendly match against Montenegro, where he conceded the only goal of the game. In 2015, he succeeded Sergei Pareiko as Estonia's number one goalkeeper.

With the emergence of young Karl Hein, Aksalu was left out of the national team selection in 2020 and 2021. However, with the whole team's isolation due to COVID-19 in March 2021 and Hein's injury in November 2021, Aksalu was recalled to the national team to face Belgium and Czech Republic for the 2022 World Cup qualifiers.

Career statistics

Club

International

Honours

Club
Flora
Estonian Cup: 2007–08, 2008–09
Estonian Supercup: 2009

SJK
Veikkausliiga: 2015
Ykkönen: 2013
Finnish Cup: 2016
Finnish League Cup: 2014

Individual
Baltic League Best Goalkeeper: 2007
Veikkausliiga Best Goalkeeper: 2015
SJK Player of the Year: 2015

References

External links

1984 births
Living people
Sportspeople from Kuressaare
Estonian footballers
Association football goalkeepers
Esiliiga players
JK Tervis Pärnu players
Meistriliiga players
FC Kuressaare players
FC Flora players
Sheffield United F.C. players
National League (English football) players
Mansfield Town F.C. players
Ykkönen players
Veikkausliiga players
Seinäjoen Jalkapallokerho players
Estonia youth international footballers
Estonia under-21 international footballers
Estonia international footballers
Estonian expatriate footballers
Expatriate footballers in England
Expatriate footballers in Finland
Estonian expatriate sportspeople in England
Estonian expatriate sportspeople in Finland